The 1986 State of Origin series was the fifth year that the annual three-match series between New South Wales and Queensland was contested entirely under "state of origin" selection rules.  It was the year that New South Wales finally asserted some dominance and won the series in the first ever 3-0 Origin whitewash. It was an inauspicious introduction to Origin coaching for Wayne Bennett who soon afterwards began plotting a reversal of fortunes that would lead to a pending period of Queensland dominance.


Games

Game I

The Blues finally brought to Origin a passion that had hitherto been associated mainly with Queensland and fielded a formidable halves pairing in Peter Sterling and Brett Kenny that found the measure of Maroons star Wally Lewis. Blues hooker Royce Simmons typified the newfound New South Wales' spirit when early in the opening game he was knocked senseless, after a vicious hit by Queensland's Greg Dowling. He staggered back into position, falling over and regaining his feet then waving trainers away as he took his place in the defensive formation before pulling off a try-saving tackle on his own tryline soon after.

The Blues led 12-2 early but by half-time the lead was cut to 12-10. Two minutes after the break Queensland forged to the front when prop Greg Dowling scored after centre Gene Miles recovered a Wally Lewis bomb. The Maroons then began to tire and Man Of The Match Royce Simmons scored from dummy half to spark a magnificent comeback, dummying past a bewildered Wally Lewis. A mistake by Queensland winger Dale Shearer opened the door for Blues' centre Andrew Farrar to score his first Origin try and the Blues led 22-16 with 13 minutes remaining and were able to hold on to a lead.

Simmons was interviewed in 2010: "The Queenslanders were going 'Ooohh, yeahh' when I fell over. They were really cheering me or bagging me or something...everytime I fell over. All I kept thinking was 'I can't get replaced; if I get replaced there goes my opportunity' so I struggled to get back up and few minutes later I was OK. It was a good win...and we played a very good Queensland side to do it"

Game II
Queensland's preparation for game II was disrupted by injuries to key players and selectors were forced to name one of the Maroons' most inexperienced line-ups.

Before a record Origin crowd of 40,707 at the SCG, the class of Lewis and Queensland again led into the second half 16-12 after 52 minutes before Sterling and Kenny engineered a New South Wales onslaught. Man-of-the-match Sterling then threw a sweetly timed pass for Kenny to take New South Wales to an 18-16 lead and four minutes later second-rower Noel Cleal crashed over between the posts for an unassailable 24-16 scoreline. Queensland scored in the final minutes through Shearer but their hopes of a last-ditch victory were dashed.

Game III
For the third year running the final match of the series was a dead rubber, but with Test positions on the line for the three clashes with New Zealand and the end of season Kangaroo tour plus the opportunity for New South Wales to become the first team to win 3-0, there was plenty to play for.

The first half produced one of Origin's most frenetic periods. By the time the teams left the field at the break seven tries had been scored and the scores were locked at 16-all. In the second stanza no more tries were added. The game was won by a Michael O'Connor penalty goal after referee Kevin Roberts had penalised Maroon's skipper Lewis for failing to clear the ruck.

With the victory New South Wales enjoyed the first ever 3-0 series whitewash.

Teams

New South Wales

Queensland

See also
1986 Winfield Cup

References

Sources
 Big League's 25 Years of Origin Collectors' Edition, News Magazines, Surry Hills, Sydney

External links
State of Origin 1986 at rugbyleagueproject.org

State of Origin series
State of Origin series